Monastery of the Mother of God in Hvosno was a Christian monastery of the Serbian Orthodox Church in the historical region of Hvosno. It was situated at the foot of Mokra Mountain, nearby hamlets Vrelo and Studenica, some 20 kilometers north of the city of Peć, in modern Kosovo. The Monastery was declared Monument of Culture of Exceptional Importance on 10 July 1967, and Republic of Serbia claims to have it under protection.

In the third decade of the 13th century, on the foundations of an older basilica, a new church dedicated to the Dormition of the Theotokos was erected in order to serve as a cathedral seat of the Serbian Orthodox Eparchy of Hvosno. The single-nave church had a dome and an altar apse, semi-circular on the inside, rectangular on the outside. On the northern and southern sides of the narthex, there were two parecclesia, whose outside was masked with a flat surface. The chapels were topped by two towers of greater height than the church dome. The church is in compliance with the Rascian architecture. In the mid-14th century, another single-nave building with a semi-circular apse on the east, and a barrel-vault was adjoined to the church. The second half of the 16th century is a period of artistic thrive of the monastery. Debris of the monastery complex were first researched in 1930, and then from 1966 to 1970, when remains of the church and the monks dwelling-house, together with segments of the fortification, were preserved.

History  
The monastery is one of the only known churches dating from the 6th century in northern Illyrica (Province of Dardania), assumed to have been built by Justinian I. It is one of the earliest structure dating from the mid-6th century, i.e. pre-Slavic migration, and therefore constructed in the early Eastern Roman style. Within its Byzantine fortification were two three-nave basilicas with its narthex belonging to the early Byzantine Period. The semi-circle apse of the main church relates to the early reign of the Emperor Justinian and the first decades of the 6th century, as later churches were built with outer three-sided apses, under the influence of the Constantinople construction style.

When the autocephalous Serbian Archbishopric was founded in 1219, seat of the newly created Eparchy of Hvosno was placed in the Monastery of the Mother of God in the region of Hvosno, and a new church was built within the monastery complex. A century and a half later, after the creation of the Serbian Patriarchate of Peć (1346), the Eparchy of Hvosno was raised to the honorary rank of a Metropolitanate, and as such it is mentioned in written sources in 1473, 1566 and 1635. The last metropolitan Victor is mentioned in 1635. During the Great Serbian Migrations, the Monastery became deserted and dilapidated.

Notes

References

Literature 

 
 
 
 
 
 
 
 
 
 
 
 

Cultural Monuments of Exceptional Importance (Serbia)
Cultural heritage of Kosovo